The Council for Responsible Genetics (CRG) was a nonprofit NGO with a focus on biotechnology.

History 
The Council for Responsible Genetics was founded in 1983 in Cambridge, Massachusetts.

An early voice concerned about the social and ethical implications of  modern genetic technologies, CRG organized a 1985 Congressional Briefing and a 1986 panel of the American Association for the Advancement of Science, both focusing on the potential dangers of genetically engineered biological weapons. Francis Boyle was asked to draft legislation setting limits on the use of genetic engineering, leading to the Biological Weapons Anti-Terrorism Act of 1989.

CRG was the first organization to advance a comprehensive, scientifically based position against human germline engineering. It was also the first to compile documented cases of genetic discrimination, laying the intellectual groundwork for the Genetic Information Nondiscrimination Act of 2008 (GINA).

The organization created both a Genetic Bill of Rights and a Citizen's Guide to Genetically Modified Food. Also notable are CRG's support for the "Safe Seeds Campaign" (for avoiding gene flow from genetically engineered to non-GE seed) and the organization of a US conference on Forensic DNA Databanks and Racial Disparities in the Criminal Justice System. In 2010 CRG led a successful campaign to roll back a controversial student genetic testing program at the University of California, Berkeley.  In 2011, CRG led a campaign to successfully enact [CalGINA] in California, which extended genetic privacy and nondiscrimination protections to life, disability and long term care insurance, mortgages, lending and other areas.

CRG issued five anthologies of commentaries:
 Rights and Liberties in the Biotech Age edited by Sheldon Krimsky and Peter Shorett 
 Race and the Genetic Revolution: Science, Myth and Culture 
 Genetic Explanations:  Sense and Nonsense edited by Krimsky and Jeremy Gruber 
 Biotechnology in our Lives edited by Krimsky and Gruber 
 The GMO Deception edited by Krimsky and Gruber
 Principles and projects
CRG "fosters public debate about the social, ethical and environmental implications of genetic technologies." They list three central principles:

The public must have access to clear and understandable information on technological innovations.
The public must be able to participate in public and private decision making concerning technological developments and their implementation.
New technologies must meet social needs. Problems rooted in poverty, racism, and other forms of inequality, according to CRG, cannot be remedied by technology alone.

In 2007, CRG hosted a retreat to refresh the mission statement and determine goals for the future of the organization. The outcome was that CRG should:
Explore and document developments in biotechnology through a holistic approach that considers science within a social, cultural, ethical, and environmental context.
Serve as a global knowledge resource, providing information and education about the potential impact of new and emerging biotechnologies.
Develop concrete policy solutions to address what CRG feels are emerging issues in biotechnology.
Mobilize and collaborate with scientists and other organizations to inform the public and promote democratic control of science.
Expose what CRG views as over-simplified and distorted claims regarding the role of genetics in human disease, development and behavior.

The pioneering contributions of CRG to public interest initiatives concerned with appropriate use of biotechnologies are recounted in the book Biotech Juggernaut: Hope, Hype, and Hidden Agendas of Entrepreneurial Bioscience (Routledge, 2019).

GeneWatch 

The CRG publishes Genewatch, America's first and (according to CRG in 2009) only magazine dedicated to monitoring biotechnology's social, ethical and environmental consequences. The publication covers a broad spectrum of issues, from genetically modified food to biological weapons, genetic privacy and discrimination, reproductive technology, and human cloning. Established in 1983, the publication won the Utne Independent Press Award for General Excellence in the category of newsletters in 2006.

Funding 
A major source of CRG's funding is the Ford Foundation, which provided $420,000 in grants during 2005-2007.

See also 
 Bioethics
 Genomics

References

External links 
 

Appropriate technology organizations
Medical and health organizations based in Massachusetts
Biotechnology organizations
Genetics organizations
1983 establishments in Massachusetts
1983 establishments in the United States
Organizations established in 1983